This is the discography of production by Trackmasters (Poke & Tone).

1990

Finesse & Synquis - Straight froom the Soul (CDS)

 00.Straight from the Soul

Red Bandit - Cool Lover Boy

 07.House People

1991

Chubb Rock - The One

 10.Cat (produced by Chubb Rock & Howie Tee, additional produced by Trackmasters)
 14.Bring 'Em Home Safely (produced by Chubb Rock & Howie Tee, additional produced by Trackmasters)

1992

Chubb Rock - I Gotta Get Mine Yo

 01. Some -O- Next Shit (produced with Chubb Rock)
 02. I'm the Man (produced with Chubb Rock)
 03. Pop 'Nuff Shit (produced with Chubb Rock)
 04. Don't Drink the Milk - (Featuring Kirk Gowdy & Poke) (produced with Chubb Rock)
 05. The Hatred (produced with Chubb Rock)
 06. Lost in the Storm (produced with Chubb Rock)
 07. Which Way Is Up (produced with Chubb Rock)
 08. Black Trek IV - The Voyage Home (produced with Chubb Rock)
 09. Yabadabadoo - (Featuring Red Hot Lover Tone & Rob Swinga) (produced with Chubb Rock)
 10. So Much Things to Say (produced with Chubb Rock)
 11. The Funky - (Featuring Kirk Pone) (produced with Chubb Rock)
 12. 3 Men at Chung King - (Featuring Red Hot Lover Tone & Grand Puba) (produced with Chubb Rock)
 13. I Need Some Blow (produced with Chubb Rock)
 14. I'm Too Much (produced with Chubb Rock)
 15. My Brother (produced with Chubb Rock)
 16. I Don't Want to Be Lonely (produced with Chubb Rock)
 17. I Gotta Get Mine Yo! (produced with Chubb Rock)
 18. A Message to the B.A.N. (produced with Chubb Rock)
 19. Enter the Dragon (produced with Chubb Rock)
 20. The Arrival (produced with Chubb Rock)
 21. See You in October (produced with Chubb Rock)

Shante - The Bitch Is Back

 08. Straight Razor

Kool G Rap & DJ Polo - Live and Let Die

 09. Straight Jacket
 10. Ill Street Blues
 15. Fuck U Man

Red Hot Lover Tone - Red Hot Lover Tone

 01. True Confessions (1:07)
 02. Da Gigolow (2:40)
 03. Winderella (3:06)
 04. Porgee (0:44)
 05. Like a Virgin (2:39)
 06. D.I.Y.M. (3:08)
 07. In the Business (4:24)
 08. I Like (3:05)
 09. Gigalow Thing (2:09)
 10. Never Love (4:51)
 11. Pussy's All That (3:03)
 12. Give It Up (3:54)
 13. It Burns (0:30)
 14. Li'l Boy Blu (3:53)
 15. Gigolows Got It Going On (3:18)
 16. Gotta Run (3:52)
 17. Sex Anonymous (1:14)
 18. My Lady (3:44)

The Real Roxanne - Go Down (But Don't Bite It)

 01. Ya Brother Does (produced with Chubb Rock)
 02. Gear - (Featuring Chubb Rock) (produced with Chubb Rock)
 03. If I Can't Have You (produced with Chubb Rock)
 04. Mama Can I Get Some (produced with Chubb Rock)
 05. Latino Blues (produced with Chubb Rock)
 06. Go Down (But Don't Bite It) (produced with Chubb Rock)
 07. Influx - (Featuring Red Hot Lover Tone) (produced with Chubb Rock)
 08. Same Real Rox (produced with Chubb Rock)
 09. Where There's a Will (produced with Chubb Rock)
 10. Roxanne Shit Is Over (produced with Chubb Rock)
 11. Roxanne's Suite (produced with Chubb Rock)

The A.T.e.E.M. - A Hero Ain't Nuttin' But a Sandwich

 01. A Hero Ain't Nuttin' But a Sandwich - Hot Dog, Rob Swinga & Chubb Rock
 02. Pass the Pussy - Hot Dog, Rob Swinga, Kirk Pone & Red Hot Lover Tone
 03. Yeah - F.M., Rob Swinga & Hot Dog
 04. Interlude
 05. Get It On (Original) - Rob Swinga, Hot Dog, Red Hot Lover Tone & Kirk Pone
 06. Come on Baby Let's Swing It - Hot Dog, Rob Swinga & Red Hot Lover Tone
 07. Come - Chubb Rock
 08. Sister Morphine - Hot Dog, Rob Swinga & Chubb Rock
 09. Well of 1000 Souls - Hot Dog, Rob Swinga & Red Hot Lover Tone
 10. One, Two, U Don't Stop - Hot Dog & Rob Swinga
 11. All of That - Rob Swinga, Hot Dog & Chubb Rock
 12. Interlude
 13. Let Me Hear You Say Hoe! - Chubb Rock & Red Hot Lover Tone
 14. Get It On (Remix) - Rob Swinga, Hot Dog, Red Hot Lover Tone & Kirk Pone

1993

Pudgee Tha Phat Bastard - Give 'Em the Finger

 01.Intro
 03. The Vibe
 04.Checkin' Out the Ave.
 05. Give 'Em the Finger
 06. When He Comes On
 07. This Is How We... - (Featuring Kool G Rap)
 09.Lady In My Life - (Featuring MC Lyte)
 11.Mommie Dearest
 12.Doin' M.C.'s Sum'n Terrible - (Featuring F.M & Snagglepuss)
 13.Clap Your Hands
 14.How U Feel About That

Big Daddy Kane - Looks Like a Job For...

 01.Looks Like a Job For...
 02.How You Get a Record Deal?

YZ - The Ghetto's Been Good to Me
 02. The Return Remix
 05. (So Far) The Ghetto's Been Good to Me (co-produced with YZ)

T.C.F. Crew - I Ain't the One

1994

Mary J. Blige - My Life

 17. Be Happy (Produced by Poke from Trackmasters)

Changing Faces - Changing Faces

 10. Baby Your Love (Co-produced with Heavy D)

Crustified Dibbs - Night of the Bloody Apes (Unreleased)

 10.Bloodshed Hua Hoo

Soul For Real - Candy Rain

 01. Candy Rain
 02. Every Little Thing
 04. If You Want It

Heavy D - Nuttin' But Love

 01. Friends & Respect
 12. Move On

The Notorious B.I.G. - Ready to Die
 10. Juicy (Produced by Poke from Trackmasters & Sean "Puffy" Combs)
 14. Respect (Produced by Poke from Trackmasters & Sean "Puffy" Combs)
 18. Who Shot Ya (Produced by Poke from Trackmasters & Sean "Puffy" Combs)

House Party 3 Soundtrack

 07. The Illest - Red Hot Lover Tone

1995

LL Cool J - Mr. Smith
 02. Make It Hot
 03. Hip Hop
 04. Hey Lover (featuring Boyz II Men)
 07. I Shot Ya (featuring Keith Murray)
 11. Hollis to Hollywood
 13. Get da Drop on 'Em'
 14. Prelude (Skit)
 15. I Shot Ya (Remix) (featuring Keith Murray, Prodigy, Fat Joe & Foxy Brown)

Faith Evans - Faith

 02. No Other Love (Produced by Poke from Trackmasters & Co-produced with Sean "Puffy" Combs)
 03. Fallin' In Love (Produced by Poke from Trackmasters & Co-produced with Sean "Puffy" Combs)

Red Hot Lover Tone - #1 Player

 05. BMW
 07. Damian's Hook (Produced by Red Hot Lover Tone from Trackmasters & Silver D)
 09. Yes Yes Y'all
 12. 4 My Peeps (Remix) - (Featuring M.O.P., The Notorious B.I.G. & Organized Konfusion) (Produced by Red Hot Lover Tone from Trackmasters & Frank "Nitty" Pimental)
 13. Take Your Time - (Featuring Don Baron)

1996

Foxy Brown - Ill Na Na

 02. Holy Matrimony (Letter To The Firm)
 03. Foxy's Bells
 04. Get Me Home - (Featuring Blackstreet)
 06. Interlude (The Set-Up) (Co-produced with George Pearson)
 07. If I...
 08. The Chase
 11. Fox Boogie - (Featuring Kid Capri)
 12. I'll Be - (Featuring Jay-Z)
 14. Big Bad Mama (Re-Release) - (Featuring Dru Hill)

Nas - It Was Written

 01. Album Intro (produced with Nas)
 02. The Message
 03. Street Dreams
 05. Watch Dem Niggas - (Featuring Foxy Brown)
 08. Affirmative Action - (Featuring Foxy Brown, AZ & Cormega) (additional production by Dave Atkinson)
 10. Black Girl Lost - (Featuring JoJo Hailey) (co-produced with L.E.S.)
 12. Shootouts
 14. If I Ruled the World (Imagine That) - (Featuring Lauryn Hill) (additional production by Rashad Smith)

Shaquille O'Neal - You Can't Stop the Reign

 05. No Love Lost - (Featuring Jay-Z & Lord Tariq)
 11. Let's Wait a While

Various Artists - Space Jam (soundtrack)
 05. Hit 'Em High (The Monstars' Anthem) - B-Real, Coolio, Method Man, LL Cool J, & Busta Rhymes

1997

Allure - Allure

 01. Introduction
 02. Anything You Want
 03. You're Gonna Love Me
 04. Head Over Heels - (Featuring Nas)
 05. No Question - (Featuring LL Cool J)
 07. The Story
 08. Come Into My House (Interlude)
 09. When You Need Someone 
 10. Give You All I Got - (Featuring Raekwon)
 11. I'll Give You Anything

AZ - Pieces of a Man (Not Included On Album)

 --. Hey AZ (Featuring SWV)

LL Cool J - Phenomenon

 02. Candy - (Featuring Ralph Tresvant & Ricky Bell)
 04. Another Dollar
 05. Nobody Can Freak You - (Featuring Keith Sweat & LeShaun)
 09. Father

Mary J. Blige - Share My World

 01. Intro
 04. Round and Round
 05. Share My World (Interlude)
 12. Keep Your Head

Mariah Carey - Butterfly

 04. The Roof

Jay-Z - In My Lifetime, Vol. 1

 10. Face Off - (Featuring Sauce Money)

The Firm - Nas, Foxy Brown, AZ, and Nature Present The Firm: The Album

 07. Firm Allstars - (Featuring Pretty Boy)
 10. Hardcore
 15. Desperado - (Featuring Canibus)
 17. I'm Leaving - (Featuring Noreaga)
 18. Throw Your Guns - (Featuring Half-A-Mil)

Will Smith - Big Willie Style

 01. Intro (Co-Produced By Will Smith)
 03. Gettin' Jiggy Wit It (Co-Produced By L.E.S.)
 04. Candy - (Featuring Larry Blackmon & Cameo) (Co-Produced By L.E.S.)
 05. Chasing Forever (Co-Produced By L.E.S.)
 06. Keith B-Real I (Interlude) (Co-Produced By Will Smith)
 08. Miami
 09. Yes Yes Y'all - (Featuring Camp Lo) (Co-Produced By L.E.S.)
 11. Keith B-Real II (Interlude) (Co-Produced By Will Smith)
 14. Keith B-Real III (Interlude) (Co-Produced By Will Smith)
 15. Big Willie Style - (Featuring Left Eye)
 16. Men in Black - (featuring Coko)
 17. Just Cruisin'

Brian McKnight - Anytime

 07. Hold Me

1998

Cam'ron - Confessions of Fire

 07. Horse & Carriage - (Featuring Mase)

R. Kelly - R.

===D1===
 03.If I'm Wit You (Co-Produced for R. Kelly)
 08. We Ride - (Featuring Jay-Z, Cam'ron, Vegas Cats & Noreaga) (Produced with R. Kelly, Co-Produced by Cory Rooney)
 11.Only the Loot Can Make Me Happy - (Featuring Background Vocals by Tone) (Co-Produced for R. Kelly)

===D2===
 03.Did You Ever Think (Produced with R. Kelly, Co-Produced by Cory Rooney)
 04.Dollar Bill - (Featuring Foxy Brown) (Produced with R. Kelly, Co-Produced by Al West)
 12.Money Makes the World Go Round - (Featuring Nas) (Co-Produced for R. Kelly)

Noreaga - N.O.R.E.
 04. N.O.R.E.
 06. Hed
 08. Fiesta

Method Man - Tical 2000: Judgement Day
 25. Break Ups 2 Make Ups - (Featuring D'Angelo)

Sparkle - Sparkle
 01. Good Life

98° - 98° And Rising
 02. Heat It Up
 09. Do You Wanna Dance

Various Artists - Woo Soundtrack
 11. Let It Be - Allure & 50 Cent (Produced with Cory Rooney)

1999

Blaque - Blaque

 06.808 (Produced with R. Kelly)
 07. Time After Time (Produced with Cory Rooney)
 10.Don't Go Looking For Love (Co-produced by Cory Rooney)
 11.Release Me (Co-produced by Cory Rooney)

50 Cent - Power of the Dollar

 06. That Ain't Gangsta
 08. Ghetto Qu'ran
 10. Money by Any Means (featuring N.O.R.E.)
 11. Material Girl (featuring Dave Hollister)
 13. Slow Doe
 14. Gun Runner (featuring Black Child)
 16. Power of the Dollar
 18. How to Rob (featuring The Madd Rapper)

Slick Rick - The Art of Storytelling

 04. Bring It to Your Hardest - (Featuring Nas)

Made Men - Classic Limited Edition

 09. Wise Guys For Life (Co-produced with L.E.S.)

Noreaga - Melvin Flynt - Da Hustler

 04. Da Hustla
 11. What the Fuck Is Up

Harlem World - The Movement

 03. Crew of the Year

Various Artists - In Too Deep Soundtrack

 08. Bleeding from the Mouth - Capone-N-Noreaga, The Lox

Various Artists - The Wood Soundtrack

 07. It's All Good - R. Kelly

Will Smith - Willennium

 03. Freakin' It

Trina & Tamara - Trina & Tamara

 12. What'd You Come Here For? (Remix) (Feat. Cam'ron & 50 Cent)

2000

Cam'ron - S.D.E.

 09. Freak

R. Kelly - TP-2.com

 08. Fiesta (co-produced with Precision)

Destiny's Child - Survivor

 01. Independent Women Part 1  (co-produced with Cory Rooney)

Nature - For All Seasons

 02. Mans World
 08. Natures Shine
 09. Smoke
 11. Talking That Shit
 13. Don't Stop

LL Cool J - G.O.A.T.

 07. Fugidabowdit - (Featuring DMX, Redman & Method Man

Toshi Kubota - Nothing But Your Love

 12. It's Over

2001

Jay-Z - The Blueprint

 5. Jigga That Nigga

2Pac - Until The End Of Time

 6. Letter 2 My Unborn
 13. Until the End of Time

Wu-Tang Clan - Iron Flag

10 Back in the Game

Nas - Stillmatic

 11. Rule (featuring Amerie)

R. Kelly - Fiesta Single

Fiesta Remix (featuring Jay-Z) (co-produced with Precision)

2002

Jennifer Lopez - J to tha L-O!: The Remixes
 03. I'm Gonna Be Alright (Trackmasters Remix) (featuring Nas/50 Cent)

Jennifer Lopez - This Is Me... Then
 07. Jenny from the Block (featuring Styles P and Jadakiss) (Produced with Cory Rooney and Troy Oliver)

Nas - The Lost Tapes
 06. "Blaze a 50" (produced with L.E.S.)
 09. "Drunk by Myself" (produced with Alvin West)
 12. "Fetus (Belly Button Window)"

R. Kelly & Jay-Z - The Best of Both Worlds
 02. Take You Home With Me a.k.a. Body (co-produced with R. Kelly)
 03. Break Up to Make Up (co-produced with R. Kelly)
 04. It Ain't Personal (co-produced with R. Kelly)
 06. Green Light (featuring Beanie Sigel) (co-produced for R. Kelly)
 08. Shake Ya Body (featuring Lil' Kim) (co-produced with R. Kelly)
 09. Somebody's Girl (co-produced with R. Kelly)
 10. Get This Money (co-produced for R. Kelly)
 11. Shorty (co-produced with R. Kelly)
 12. Honey (co-produced with R. Kelly)

Tyrese - I Wanna Go There
 14. Taking Forever (featuring Mos Def)

LL Cool J - 10 (LL Cool J album) 
 2. Born to Love You
 4. Paradise (LL Cool J song) (featuring Amerie)
 14. Mirror Mirror

2003

Fabolous - Street Dreams
03. "Damn"
04. "Call Me"

2004

R. Kelly & Jay-Z - Unfinished Business
 01. The Return (co-produced by Alexander "Spanador" Mosley)
 02. Big Chips (co-produced by Alexander "Spanador" Mosley)
 03. We Got Em Goin'  (co-produced with R. Kelly)
 04. She's Coming Home With Me (co-produced by Alexander "Spanador" Mosley)
 06. Stop (featuring Foxy Brown (rapper))
 07. Mo' Money 
 08. Pretty Girls (co-produced with R. Kelly)
 09. Break Up (That's All We Do)
 10. Don't Let Me Die (co-produced with R. Kelly) (co-produced by Alexander "Spanador" Mosley)
 11. The Return Remix (featuring Slick Rick and Doug E. Fresh) (co-produced by Alexander "Spanador" Mosley)

Fabolous - Real Talk
 07. Girls

Tamia - More
 01. On My Way
 02. More

2005

Rihanna - Music of the Sun 
3. If It's Lovin' That You Want

2006

LL Cool J - Todd Smith 
03. Favorite Flavor (featuring Mary J. Blige)
08. I've Changed (featuring Ryan Toby)
10. #1 Fan
11. Down the Aisle (featuring 112)
13. So Sick (Remix) (featuring Ne-Yo)

Governor - Son of Pain 
01. Blood, Sweat & Tears

2008

The Game - L.A.X.
20. Ain't Fuckin With You (iTunes bonus track)

Ludacris - Theater of the Mind
04. One More Drink (featuring T-Pain)

Ray J - All I Feel
07. Boyfriend

Keyshia Cole - A Different Me
13. Where This Love Could End Up (produced by Poke & Tone and The Are)
14. Beautiful Music (co-produced by Spanador)

Jamie Foxx - Intuition
16. Cover Girl (featuring Lil' Kim)

2009

Lil'Kim
 Download (featuring T-Pain & Charlie Wilson)

2013

LL Cool J - Authentic
 01. Bath Salt
 03. New Love (featuring Charlie Wilson)
 06. Something About You (Love the World) (featuring Charlie Wilson, Earth, Wind & Fire & Melody Thornton)
 07. Bartender Please (featuring Snoop Dogg, Bootsy Collins & Travis Barker)
 08. Whaddup (featuring Chuck D., Travis Barker, Tom Morello & Z-Trip)
 10. Closer (featuring Monica)
 14. Jump on It
 15. Take It (featuring Joe)

Remixes
1991: "Sobb Story" (Remix) - Leaders Of The New School featuring Rampage
1995: "I'll Be There for You/You're All I Need to Get By" (Puff Daddy Mix) - Method Man featuring Mary J. Blige
1995: "Wanna Make Moves" (Remix) - Red Hot Lover Tone
1996: "This Is for the Lover in You" (Remix) - Babyface 
1996: "Loungin" (Remix) - LL Cool J and Total
1996: "Street Dreams" (Remix) - Nas featuring R. Kelly
1996: "They Don't Care About Us" (Remix) - Michael Jackson
1996: "Hit Me Off" (Trackmasters Remix) - New Edition
1996: "Underneath the Stars" (The Drifting Remix) - Mariah Carey
1997: "Wishing on a Star" (Trackmasters Remix) - Jay-Z
1997: "Just Cruisin'" (Trackmasters Remix) - Will Smith 
1997: "Don't Know" (Trackmasters Remix) - Mario Winans featuring Mase and Allure
1998: "Changes - 2Pac
1998: "We're Unified" (Trackmasters Remix) Kid Capri featuring Slick Rick and Snoop Doggy Dogg
1999: "Bills, Bills, Bills" (Trackmasters Remix) - Destiny's Child Featuring Jaz-Ming & Sporty Thievz
1999: "Did You Ever Think" (Remix) - R. Kelly featuring Nas
1999: "Hold Me" (Trackmasters Remix) - Brian McKnight featuring Kobe Bryant
1999: "Livin' la Vida Loca" (Trackmasters Remix) - Ricky Martin featuring Big Pun, Cuban Link and Fat Joe
1999: "I Need to Know" (Trackmasters Remix) - Marc Anthony featuring Remy Ma
2000: "The Best of Me" (Trackmasters Remix) - Mýa featuring Jadakiss & "Best of Me, Part 2" featuring Jay-Z
2000: "I Can't Take It (No More Remix)" - 3LW featuring Nas
2001: "Request Line" (Trackmasters Remix) - The Black Eyed Peas featuring Macy Gray
2001: "Hit 'em Up Style (Oops!)" (Trackmasters Remix) - Blu Cantrell featuring Foxy Brown
2001: "Christmas in Jamaica" (Remix) - Toni Braxton featuring Shaggy
2001: "You Rock My World" (Trackmasters Remix) - Michael Jackson featuring Jay-Z
2011: "Butterflies" (Trackmasters Remix) - Michael Jackson featuring Eve
2001: "Caramel" (Trackmasters Joint Remix) - City High
2001: "Ice King" (Remix) - Res featuring Nas
2001: "U Remind Me" (Trackmasters Remix) - Usher featuring Method Man and Blu Cantrell
2002: "Jenny from the Block" (Trackmasters Remix) - Jennifer Lopez featuring Jadakiss and Styles P
2002: "I'm Gonna Be Alright" (Trackmasters Remix) - Jennifer Lopez featuring Nas
2003: "Talkin' to Me" (Trackmasters Remix) - Amerie featuring Foxy Brown
2003: "I've Got Something Better" (Trackmasters Remix) - Lisa Stansfield

Production discographies
Hip hop discographies
Discographies of American artists